Marshall Burke (born 26 March 1959) is a Scottish former footballer.

He played for Burnley, Leeds United, Blackburn Rovers, Lincoln City, Cardiff City, Tranmere Rovers and Scarborough. He was part of the Colne Dynamoes team which won the 1987–88 FA Vase competition.

Post football career
Burke has worked for over 25 years in the brewing industry. He spent several years with Scottish & Newcastle, Chorley, before taking sales positions with Vaux Breweries in Rochdale and Boddingtons (Whitbread), Manchester. In 2000, he joined Thwaites Brewery, firstly as key accounts manager before becoming sales manager for the free trade. In November 2013 he joined Moorhouse's Brewery as sales manager where he is expected to help the company's plans for their new £4.2m cask-ale brewing complex.

Notes

External links
 

1959 births
Living people
Footballers from Glasgow
Scottish footballers
Association football midfielders
Burnley F.C. players
Leeds United F.C. players
Blackburn Rovers F.C. players
Lincoln City F.C. players
Cardiff City F.C. players
Tranmere Rovers F.C. players
Scarborough F.C. players
English Football League players
National League (English football) players